Jocelyne Boisseau is a French film and television actress. She was married at one time to the German actor Gernot Endemann.

Selected filmography
  (1977)
 Perceval (1978)
 Pour tout l'or du Transvaal (feuilleton en 6 épisodes) (1979) de Claude Boissol: Marguerite  
 Randale (film) de  Manfred Purzer (1983) : Agnes
 Der Schatz im Niemandsland (1987, TV miniseries)
 Moselbrück (1987–1993, TV series)

References

Bibliography
 Ewert, Kevin. Henry V: A Guide to the Text and Its Theatrical Life. Palgrave Macmillan, 2006.

External links

1953 births
Living people
French film actresses
French television actresses
Actresses from Paris